Challah (Hebrew: חלה, literally "Loaf") is the ninth tractate of Seder Zeraim ("Order of Seeds"). It discusses the laws of the dough offering, known in Hebrew as challah.

Like most of the tractates in Zeraim, it appears only in the Mishnah, and does not appear in the Babylonian Talmud, but rather in the Talmud Yerushalmi and Tosefta only.

The location of the tractate in Seder Zera'im
According to Maimonides' introduction to the Mishnah, the tractate of Challah is arranged after the tractate of Ma'aser Sheni, "because after we take out all of these gifts – which are 'terumah' and maaser rishon and [maaser] sheni – then we grind it and make it into flour and knead it, and then we become obligated in 'challah.'".

Contents
There are 38 mishnayot in Hallah. They are divided into four chapters as follows:
 חֲמִשָּׁה דְּבָרִים Five species (Nine mishnayot) - what dough is required for Challah
 פֵּרוֹת Produce (Eight mishnayot) - How to separate the challah.
 אוֹכְלִין One may snack (ten mishnayot) - Laws of embezzlement of challah
 שְׁתֵּי נָשִׁים Two women - (eleven mishnayos) - the combination of doughs, and the laws of giving to a priest.

Commentaries on the tractate
Unlike other tractates in the order of Zeraim, a number of essays were written on the tractate Challah. This is due to the fact that the mitzvah of dough offering is also practiced outside of Israel and during exile. In addition to the commentaries on the Mishnah and the Yerushalmi and the Rambam's rulings, the Ramban wrote Halachot (like the rulings of the Rif for the rest of the tractates), followed by Rashba and Rosh. A special place is given the Maharit Algazi's commentary on the Hilchot Challah of the Ramban.

In addition, the Poskim such as the Tur and the Shulchan Aruch and their commentators have written about Hilchot Challah in Yoreh De'ah.

See also
Challa (disambiguation page)

External links
Full text of the Mishnah for tractate Challah on Sefaria (Hebrew and English)

Notes

References

Challah
Land of Israel laws in Judaism
Positive Mitzvoth